The Kathia are a Jutt Muslim tribe of Indian Subcontinent. Many leaders of Kathia tribe were main participants in the Indian Rebellion of 1857 led by Rai Ahmad Khan Kharal.

Historical Background 

According to their traditions, the Kathia are descended from Rajah Karan of the Mahabharat. Originally they resided in Bikaner, whence they migrated and founded the state of Kathiawar, which takes its name from the Kathia tribe(Kathi people), and is in modern-day Gujarat State of India. Although the exact reason of their migration from Kathiawar, in the Middle Ages, is unclear and have many different folklores attached to it but the most likely to believe is that groups of Kathi tribesmen migrated to great Indus Plains in search of more agricultural land and better pastures for their cattle's and horses, as the Kathi people were also a pastoral tribe. They spread in Punjab and parts of Sindh. The bigger family living in Punjab Province is recognized by the name of Kathia while the family living in Sindh is called Kathio(mainly due to difference in local language dialects) and are less in population comparatively.

Present Circumstances 
Today, they are mainly scattered around bank of River Ravi and Chenab. Here they are politically active and contest on different seats of National and Provincial Assemblies. Even today their main source of income depends on agricultural and cattle farming and are regarded as respectable Zamindars of their areas.

References

Muslim communities of India